Oskar Anshelm Sjöstedt-Jussila (25 August 1869 in Akaa – 6 February 1926; original surname Sjöstedt) was a Finnish farmer and politician. He was a member of the Parliament of Finland, representing the Finnish Party from 1911 to 1918 and the National Coalition Party from 1918 to 1919 and from 1924 to 1925.

References

1869 births
1926 deaths
People from Akaa
People from Häme Province (Grand Duchy of Finland)
Finnish Lutherans
Finnish Party politicians
National Coalition Party politicians
Members of the Parliament of Finland (1911–13)
Members of the Parliament of Finland (1913–16)
Members of the Parliament of Finland (1916–17)
Members of the Parliament of Finland (1917–19)
Members of the Parliament of Finland (1924–27)
People of the Finnish Civil War (White side)